The Seirococcaceae are a family of brown algae, containing five genera:

 Cystosphaera Skottsberg, 1907
 Marginariella Tandy, 1936
 Phyllospora C.Agardh, 1839
 Scytothalia Greville, 1830
 Seirococcus Greville, 1830

References

Fucales
Brown algae families